Texas County is a county located in the panhandle of the U.S. state of Oklahoma. Its county seat is Guymon. As of the 2010 census, the population was 20,640. It is the second largest county in Oklahoma, based on land area, and is named for Texas, the state that adjoins the county to its south.
Texas County comprises the Guymon, OK Micropolitan Statistical Area.
The county economy is largely based on farming and cattle production. It is one of the top-producing counties in the U.S. for wheat, cattle, and hogs. It also lies within the noted Hugoton-Panhandle natural gas field.

Being 50.6% Hispanic, Texas is also Oklahoma's only Hispanic-majority county as of 2020.

History
Texas County was formed at Oklahoma statehood (November 16, 1907) from the central one-third of "Old Beaver County". When the formation of the county was authorized by the Constitutional Convention of 1907, the county was so named because it was wholly included within the limits of the Texas Cession of 1850, whereby the ownership of the area was passed from the State of Texas to the United States government. From 1850 to 1890, its lands were never attached to any state or territory, never surveyed, and never divided into townships and sections like the eastern counties were. From 1890 to 1907, it was part of Beaver County.

Geography
It is the second-largest county in Oklahoma by area. The county lies in the High Plains of the Great Plains physiographic region. It is generally flat, but has some rolling hills. It is drained by the North Canadian River, often called the Beaver River in this area. Tributaries of the river are Coldwater, Hackberry, Goff, Teepee, and Pony Creeks.

For tourism purposes, the county's location in Northwest Oklahoma puts it in the area designated by the Oklahoma Department of Tourism as Red Carpet Country.

Adjacent counties
 Stevens County, Kansas (north)
 Seward County, Kansas (northeast)
 Beaver County (east)
 Ochiltree County, Texas (southeast)
 Hansford County, Texas (south)
 Sherman County, Texas (southwest)
 Cimarron County (west)
 Morton County, Kansas (northwest)

Texas County is one of four counties in the United States to border the state with which it shares its name (the other three are Nevada County, California, Delaware County, Pennsylvania, and Ohio County, West Virginia).

National protected area
 Optima National Wildlife Refuge

Demographics

As of the 2010 census, there were 20,640 people, 7,212 households, and 5,147 families residing in the county.  The population density was 4/km2 (10/mi2).  There were 8,208 housing units at an average density of 2/km2 (4/mi2).  The racial makeup of the county was 75.7% White, 1.6% Black or African American, 1.3% Native American, 1.6% Asian, 0.2% Pacific Islander, 16.9% from other races, and 2.8% from two or more races.  42.0% of the population were Hispanic or Latino of any race (34.3% Mexican, 3.5% Guatemalan, 0.7% Cuban, 0.7% Spanish). 65.7% spoke English and 33.1% Spanish as their first language.

There were 7,153 households, out of which 39.00% had children under the age of 18 living with them, 61.50% were married couples living together, 7.50% had a female householder with no husband present, and 26.60% were non-families. 21.20% of all households were made up of individuals, and 8.20% had someone living alone who was 65 years of age or older.  The average household size was 2.75 and the average family size was 3.19.

In the county, the population was spread out, with 28.80% under the age of 18, 12.70% from 18 to 24, 29.10% from 25 to 44, 19.20% from 45 to 64, and 10.20% who were 65 years of age or older.  The median age was 30 years. For every 100 females there were 105.90 males.  For every 100 females age 18 and over, there were 106.90 males.

The median income for a household in the county was $35,872, and the median income for a family was $42,226. Males had a median income of $26,991 versus $20,404 for females. The per capita income for the county was $15,692.  About 10.20% of families and 14.10% of the population were below the poverty line, including 17.80% of those under age 18 and 7.40% of those age 65 or over.

Politics

Economy

Cattle raising was the most important economic activity before and after statehood. Farming rose in importance after the 1890s. Despite the occurrence of the Dust Bowl these two sectors have recovered and prospered. By 1990, Texas County led the state in producing grain sorghums, with 4.2 million bushels, or one-quarter of the state's harvest, and was the state's fourth-largest wheat-producing county, harvesting 10.3 million bushels. By 1997 it was the state's top producer of both hogs and cattle. 
Texas County was the fifth-ranked county in the entire nation in 2017 for the number of hogs produced (1,094,877), and pork producer Seaboard Foods is the county’s primary employer.

Petroleum exploration began in 1922 and resulted in natural gas production from the Hugoton Gas Field. The county remains the nation's largest producer of natural gas. Four carbon black plants operated near Optima from the mid-1930s through the 1940s.  The field extends from Hugoton, Kansas into the Texas Panhandle.

The 2000 MW Windcatcher wind farm project, consisting of 800 wind turbines from GE and a high voltage AC power line, was proposed for Texas County and adjacent Cimarron County, but ran into opposition and was finally cancelled in July 2018.

Education
The Oklahoma Legislature created the Pan-Handle Agricultural Institute in 1909, offering secondary agricultural education for the Panhandle area. In 1921, the legislature changed the name to Panhandle Agricultural and Mechanical College and authorized the school to offer a two-year curriculum. In 1925, the State Board of Agriculture authorized upper division college courses, and in 1926, junior and senior level courses were added. The school name has been changed twice since then, to Oklahoma Panhandle State College of Agriculture and Applied Science (OPSU) in 1967 and to Oklahoma Panhandle State University in 1974. The school is in Goodwell.

Transportation

Major highways

  U.S. Highway 54
  U.S. Highway 56
  U.S. Highway 64
  U.S. Highway 412
  State Highway 3
  State Highway 94
  State Highway 95
  State Highway 136

Airports
Guymon Municipal Airport is a city-owned, public-use airport located two nautical miles (3.7 km) west of the central business district of City of Guymon in Texas County.

Communities

Cities
 Guymon (county seat)
 Hooker

Towns
 Goodwell
 Hardesty
 Optima
 Texhoma (divided town with Texhoma, Texas)
 Tyrone

Unincorporated communities
 Adams
 Baker
 Eva
 Four Corners
 Hough
 Mouser
 Muncy
 Hitchland (partially in Texas)
 Nabisco Township (no longer exists, 1910 census)

NRHP sites

The following are included among the twenty-four sites in Texas County listed on the National Register of Historic Places

See also
 Oklahoma Panhandle

References

External links

 Texas County, Oklahoma 
 Oklahoma Digital Maps: Digital Collections of Oklahoma and Indian Territory

 
1907 establishments in Oklahoma
Populated places established in 1907
Oklahoma Panhandle